The title Surinamese Footballer of the Year (Voetballer van het Jaar) has been awarded in Suriname since 1964. The award is determined by a poll of Surinamese sports journalists as members of the VSJS (Vereniging van Sportjournalisten in Suriname) established in 2014, replacing the SOC (Suriname Olympic Committee) who determined the winners in the years prior.

Footballer of the Year

Footballer of the Century

See also
 List of SVB Hoofdklasse top scorers

References

External links
 RSSSF
 SVB Official website

Footballers in Suriname
Association football player of the year awards by nationality
Surinamese awards
Annual events in Suriname
Awards established in 1964
1964 establishments in Suriname
Association football player non-biographical articles